Lubbock Power and Light (LP&L) is third largest municipal electric utility in Texas. LP&L serves more than 101,000 electric meters and owns and maintains  of power lines and three power plants in and around the City of Lubbock, Texas.

History 
In 1909, Lubbock Electric Light & Power Company was the first attempt at forming a private power company in Lubbock. However, the company failed shortly thereafter. Lubbock Light & Ice Company was formed following the demise of the first company. Expected growth was not realized, so company was sold in 1913 to local businessmen who renamed it Malone Light & Ice Company. The Malone company was sold to Texas Utilities Co. on September 7, 1915.

On December 21, 1916, the Lubbock city council voted to build a new power plant after failing to negotiate rate concessions from Texas Utilities. The plant came online on or before September 17, 1917, and formed the backbone of what eventually became LP&L.

From 1993 to 2003, successive city councils drew more than $60 million from the company's reserve fund to cover unrelated expenses. Additionally, six years of chronic mismanagement resulted in a $22 million operating deficit. The company teetered on bankruptcy. Beginning in 2004, the city restructured the company, including creating an independent utility board. Contributions to the city's general fund restarted in 2010.

The company completed the acquisition of Xcel Energy’s meters and distribution systems within the city on October 29, 2010. The assets were previously owned by the Southwest Public Service Co., effectively ending sixty years of competition between the two companies.

About 

LP&L engages in electricity generation and distribution, as well as billing and meter reading services.

Executives 

 David McCalla, Director of Electric Utilities
 Jenny Smith, General Counsel
 Andy Burcham, Assistant Director/CFO
 Blair McGinnis, Chief Operating Officer
 Chris Sims, Director of Grid Control & Compliance
 Matt Rose, Public Affairs & Government Relations Manager

Electric Utility Board 
On November 2, 2004, Lubbock voters elected to amend the Charter of the City to provide for an Electric Utility Board to supervise LP&L. The board's responsibilities include oversight, fiscal maintenance, and promotion of an orderly economic and business-like administration of LP&L.

 Dan Odom, Chairman
 Kevin McMahon, Vice Chairman
 Gwen Stafford, Secretary
 Don Boatman
 Edwin E. “Butch” Davis, P.E.
 Solomon Fields
 Jane U. Henry
 Eddie Schulz
 Greg Taylor
 Dan Pope, Mayor of Lubbock

References

External links 
 
 

1916 establishments in Texas
Municipal electric utilities of the United States